Haralampie "Hari" Hadži-Risteski (Macedonian: Харалампие Хаџи-Ристески) was a president of the Football Federation of Macedonia.

A former president of FK Pobeda, he was elected president of the Macedonian Football Union in 2002, beating former player Darko Pančev in the votings. He was replaced by former Vardar coach Ilčo Gjorgjioski in 2012.

References

Year of birth missing (living people)
Living people
Football people in North Macedonia